Myay Saung Nat (lit. "Earth Guardian Spirit"), are Burmese nats (spirits) who inhabit the roots of trees and serve as guardians of the earth.

They are related to Thitpin Saung Nat and Akathaso who respectively live on the tree trunks and sky. Akathaso are guardian spirits of the sky while Thitpin Saung Nat are guardian spirits of tree.

Gallery

Notes

References

 

Burmese nats
Earth deities